Frozen Head is a mountain in Morgan County, Tennessee. Frozen Head is located in Frozen Head State Park and Natural Area.

References

Landforms of Morgan County, Tennessee
Mountains of Tennessee